Harris Bridge may refer to:

Harris Bridge (Americus, Kansas), listed on the National Register of Historic Places in Lyon County, Kansas
Harris Street Bridge, Taunton, Massachusetts, listed on the NRHP in Massachusetts
Harris Bridge (Wren, Oregon), listed on the National Register of Historic Places in Benton County, Oregon